Neomia Rogers (born July 12, 1940) is an American athlete. She competed in the women's high jump at the 1960 Summer Olympics.

References

External links
 

1940 births
Living people
Athletes (track and field) at the 1960 Summer Olympics
American female high jumpers
Olympic track and field athletes of the United States
Athletes (track and field) at the 1959 Pan American Games
Pan American Games track and field athletes for the United States
Place of birth missing (living people)
21st-century American women